Mary Jean Loutsenhizer, known professionally as Chris Connor (November 8, 1927 – August 29, 2009) was an American jazz singer.

Biography
Chris Connor was born Mary Loutsenhizer in Kansas City, Missouri, to Clyde Loutsenhizer and Mabel Shirley. She became proficient on the clarinet, having studied for eight years during middle school and high school. She sang with the college band at the University of Missouri, playing at functions in Columbia, Missouri.

In 1949 Connor recorded two songs with Claude Thornhill's band: "There's a Small Hotel" and "I Don't Know Why". With Jerry Wald's big band she recorded "You're the Cream in My Coffee", "Cherokee", "Pennies from Heaven", "Raisins and Almonds", and "Terremoto". Connor and Thornhill reunited in 1952 for a radio broadcast from the Statler Hotel in New York City for which she sang "Wish You Were Here", Come Rain or Come Shine", "Sorta Kinda", and "Who Are We to Say".

She made her final recordings for HighNote: Haunted Heart in 2001 and Everything I Love in 2003.

Billboard reported in 1955 that Connor's first two solo albums for Bethlehem, Sings Lullabys of Birdland and Sings Lullabys for Lovers ranked No. 1 and No. 2 on the jazz chart for the week ending April 23, 1955. In 1957, she ranked No. 10 in the Favorite Female Vocalist disk jockey popularity poll behind Lena Horne and June Christy.

Death
A resident of Toms River, New Jersey, Connor died there from cancer on August 29, 2009, at the age of 81. Her longtime partner was her manager, Lori Muscarelle.

Discography

 Sings Lullabys of Birdland (Bethlehem, 1954)
 Sings Lullabys for Lovers (Bethlehem, 1954)
 This Is Chris (Bethlehem, 1955)
 Chris (Bethlehem, 1956)
 Chris Connor (Atlantic, 1956)
 He Loves Me, He Loves Me Not (Atlantic, 1956)
 I Miss You So (Atlantic, 1957)
 Chris Connor Sings the George Gershwin Almanac of Song (Atlantic, 1957)
 Chris Craft (Atlantic, 1958)
 A Jazz Date with Chris Connor (Atlantic, 1958)
 Sings Ballads of the Sad Cafe (Atlantic, 1959)
 Witchcraft (Atlantic, 1959)
 Chris in Person (Atlantic, 1959)
 A Portrait of Chris (Atlantic, 1960)
 Two's Company with Maynard Ferguson (Roulette, 1961)
 Double Exposure with Maynard Ferguson (Atlantic, 1961)
 Free Spirits (Atlantic, 1962)
 At the Village Gate: Early Show/Late Show (FM, 1963)
 A Weekend in Paris (FM, 1964)
 Sings Gentle Bossa Nova (ABC-Paramount, 1965)
 Chris Conner Now! (ABC 1966)
 Sketches (Stanyan, 1972)
 Sweet and Swinging (Progressive, 1978)
 Live (Applause, 1983)
 Three Pearls with Ernestine Anderson, Carol Sloane (Eastworld, 1984)
 Love Being Here with You (Stash, 1984)
 Classic (Contemporary, 1987)
 New Again (Contemporary, 1988)
 As Time Goes by (Enja, 1991)
 Angel Eyes (Alfa, 1991)
 The London Connection (Audiophile, 1993)
 Haunted Heart (HighNote, 2001)
 I Walk with Music (HighNote, 2002)
 Everything I Love (HighNote, 2003)
the Finest of Chris Connor
(Bethlehem, 1975)

References

External links
[ Allmusic biography]
Songbirds: Chris Connor

1927 births
2009 deaths
Jazz musicians from Missouri
Musicians from Kansas City, Missouri
Singers from Missouri
20th-century American singers
20th-century American women singers
American women jazz singers
American jazz singers
Atlantic Records artists
Contemporary Records artists
Enja Records artists
Cool jazz musicians
Cool jazz singers
American lesbian musicians
LGBT people from Missouri
American LGBT singers
Deaths from cancer in New Jersey
People from Toms River, New Jersey
Torch singers
Traditional pop music singers
20th-century American LGBT people
21st-century American LGBT people
21st-century American women